FIBA AfroBasket 2017 was the 29th edition of the AfroBasket, a men's basketball continental championship of Africa. The tournament was jointly hosted by Tunisia and Senegal. Angola was proposed by FIBA Africa to host the tournament, an offer declined as the country is holding general elections in the same period.

Tunisia won their second title after defeating Nigeria 77–65 in the final, while Senegal caught the third place by beating Morocco 73–62.

Qualification

Host selection
On 30 June 2017 FIBA Africa confirmed that Tunisia and Senegal will jointly host FIBA AfroBasket.

Venues

Draw
The draw was held on 16 July 2017 in Mauritius.

Squads

Preliminary round
All times in Radès are UTC+1 and in Dakar are UTC±0.

Group A

Group B

Group C

Group D

Knockout stage

Bracket

Quarterfinals

Semifinals

Third place game

Final

Final standing

Statistical leaders

Players
Source

Points

Rebounds

Assists

Steals

Blocks

Other statistical leaders

Teams
Source

Points

Rebounds

Assists

Steals

Blocks

Other statistical leaders

Tournament game highs

Awards

All Tournament Team
 Mohamed Hadidane
 Ikenna Iroegbu
 Ike Diogu
 Mourad El Mabrouk
 Gorgui Dieng

References

External links
Official website

 
2017
2017 in African basketball
2017 in Tunisian sport
2017 in Senegalese sport
International basketball competitions hosted by Tunisia
International basketball competitions hosted by Senegal
AfroBasket 2017
Sports competitions in Radès
21st century in Radès